Who Do You Love? may refer to:

Music

Albums
 Who Do You Love? (album), by King Adora

Songs
 "Who Do You Love" (Bernard Wright song), 1985
 "Who Do You Love?" (Bo Diddley song), 1956
 "Who Do You Love" (Haddaway song), 1998
 "Who Do You Love" (Marianas Trench song), 2015
 "Who Do You Love?" (Ryan O'Shaughnessy song), 2013
 "Who Do You Love" (The Chainsmokers song), 2019
 "Who Do You Love?" (YG song), 2014
 "Who Do U Love", 1996 song by Deborah Cox
 "Who Do U Love?" (Monsta X song), 2019
 "Who Do You Love", 1992 song by Audio Adrenaline from Audio Adrenaline
 "Who Do You Love?", 1908 song by Collins & Harlan
 "Who Do You Love", 1975 song by Ian Hunter
 "Who Do You Love", 2000 song by the Moffatts from Submodalities
 "Who Do You Love", 1964 song by the Sapphires
 "Who Do U Love", 1998 song by Love Inc.

Other uses
 Who Do You Love? (film), a 2008 film biopic of American record producer Leonard Chess

See also
 Who Do Ya (Love), a 1978 album by KC and the Sunshine Band
 "Who You Love", a 2013 song by John Mayer